The 2000–01 season was the 89th season in the history of En Avant de Guingamp and the club's first season back in the top flight of French football since 1998. In addition to the domestic league, Guingamp participated in this season's editions of the Coupe de France and the Coupe de la Ligue.

Players

First-team squad

Transfers

Pre-season and friendlies

Competitions

Overall record

French Division 1

League table

Results summary

Results by round

Matches

Coupe de France

Coupe de la Ligue

References

En Avant Guingamp seasons
Guingamp